is a Japanese professional footballer who plays as an attacking midfielder for Polish club Górnik Zabrze, on loan from Omiya Ardija.

Career
After raising through Omiya Ardija youth ranks, Okunuki signed for the top team in January 2018.

On 31 August 2022, he left Omiya to join Ekstraklasa side Górnik Zabrze on a season-long loan, with the Polish club keeping an option to make the move permanent.

Club statistics
Updated to 29 August 2018.

References

External links

Profile at J. League
Profile at Omiya Ardija

1999 births
Living people
Association football people from Tochigi Prefecture
Japanese footballers
J2 League players
Ekstraklasa players
Omiya Ardija players
Górnik Zabrze players
Association football forwards
Japanese expatriate footballers
Expatriate footballers in Poland
Japanese expatriate sportspeople in Poland